Philip Albert Walker (born 27 January 1957) is an English former footballer who played in the Football League for Chesterfield, Rotherham United, Cardiff City and Scarborough.

He now coaches children at Center Parcs in Sherwood Forest, Nottingham and has been there since it opened in 1988.

Following his son's recovery from lymphoma, he has arranged a series of charity football matches raising well over £100000. In April 2017 he became a magistrate.

References

External links
 

English footballers
English Football League players
1957 births
Living people
Chesterfield F.C. players
Rotherham United F.C. players
Cardiff City F.C. players
Scarborough F.C. players
Association football forwards